Eden Bekele Hailemariam (born 3 December 1996) is an Ethiopian racing cyclist. She rode in the women's road race at the 2016 UCI Road World Championships, but she did not finish the race.

Major results
Source: 

2015
 National Road Championships
2nd Time trial
2nd Road race
2016
 African Road Championships
2nd  Team time trial
9th Time trial
2019
 7th Road race, African Road Championships

References

External links
 

1996 births
Living people
Ethiopian female cyclists
Place of birth missing (living people)